Silmissin is a village in the Nandiala Department of Boulkiemdé Province in central western Burkina Faso. It has a population of 241.

References

Populated places in Boulkiemdé Province